Baeolidia is a genus of aeolid nudibranchs, marine gastropod molluscs in the family Aeolidiidae.

Species
Species in the genus Baeolidia include:
 Baeolidia australis (Rudman, 1982)
 Baeolidia chaka (Gosliner, 1985)
 Baeolidia cryoporos Bouchet, 1977
 Baeolidia dela (Er. Marcus & Ev. Marcus, 1960)
 Baeolidia gracilis Carmona, Pola, Gosliner & Cervera, 2014
 Baeolidia harrietae (Rudman, 1982)
 Baeolidia japonica Baba, 1933
 Baeolidia lunaris Carmona, Pola, Gosliner & Cervera, 2014
 Baeolidia macleayi (Angas, 1864)
 Baeolidia moebii Bergh, 1888
 Baeolidia palythoae Gosliner, 1985
 Baeolidia quoyi Pruvot-Fol, 1934
 Baeolidia ransoni (Pruvot-Fol, 1956)
 Baeolidia rieae Carmona, Pola, Gosliner & Cervera, 2014
 Baeolidia salaamica (Rudman, 1982)
 Baeolidia scottjohnsoni Carmona, Pola, Gosliner & Cervera, 2014
 Baeolidia variabilis Carmona, Pola, Gosliner & Cervera, 2014

Species brought into synonymy
 Baeolidia benteva Er. Marcus, 1958: synonym of Anteaeolidiella benteva (Er. Marcus, 1958)
 Baeolidia fusiformis Baba, 1949: synonym of Limenandra fusiformis (Baba, 1949)
 Baeolidia major Elliot, 1903: synonym of Baeolidia moebii Bergh, 1888
 Baeolidia nodosa (Haefelfinger & Stamm, 1958): synonym of Limenandra nodosa Haefelfinger & Stamm, 1958

References

Aeolidiidae